Alexander Acland Hood may refer to:

Sir Alexander Hood, 2nd Baronet, MP for Somerset West
Sir Alexander Fuller-Acland-Hood, 3rd Baronet, MP for Somerset West
Alexander Fuller-Acland-Hood, 1st Baron St Audries, MP for Wellington, son
Alexander Fuller-Acland-Hood, 2nd Baron St Audries, son; of the Hood baronets

See also
Alexander Hood (disambiguation)
Hood Baronets